James Conner Greene (born April 4, 1995) is an American professional baseball pitcher for the Diablos Rojos del México of the Mexican League. He has played in Major League Baseball (MLB) for the Baltimore Orioles and Los Angeles Dodgers. The Toronto Blue Jays drafted him in the seventh round of the 2013 MLB draft.

Professional career

Toronto Blue Jays
Greene attended Santa Monica High School, where he posted a 1.63 earned run average (ERA) and 76 strikeouts in his senior year, and was drafted by the Blue Jays in the seventh round of the 2013 Major League Baseball draft. He had committed to play baseball at the College of Southern Nevada, but he chose to sign with the Blue Jays for $100,000 rather than attend. He was assigned to the Rookie-level Gulf Coast League Blue Jays for the 2013 season, and pitched to a 1–1 record, 5.28 ERA, and 20 strikeouts in 30 innings. Greene split the 2014 season with the GCL Blue Jays and the Rookie Advanced Bluefield Blue Jays, and posted a 3–4 record, 3.03 ERA, and 51 strikeouts in 59 innings pitched.

Greene began the 2015 season with the Single-A Lansing Lugnuts, where he posted a 7–3 win–loss record, 3.88 ERA, and 65 strikeouts in 67 innings, before being promoted to the High-A Dunedin Blue Jays. He debuted for Dunedin on July 4 and took the loss, allowing four runs on nine hits. On August 6, Greene set a career-high in strikeouts, with 10, while pitching seven shutout innings for Dunedin. He was then promoted to the Double-A New Hampshire Fisher Cats, and took the win in his debut on August 13, pitching six shutout innings against the Akron RubberDucks. Greene made 26 starts in the 2015 season, posting a combined 12–7 record, 3.54 ERA, and 115 strikeouts in 132 innings.

Greene was invited to Major League spring training on January 12, 2016, and reassigned to minor league camp on March 10. Greene was assigned to the Dunedin Blue Jays to open the 2016 minor league season. He was promoted to Double-A New Hampshire in early July, and pitched his first career complete game and shutout on July 26, defeating the Harrisburg Senators 1–0. Greene made 27 total starts in 2016, and pitched to a 10–9 record, 3.51 ERA, and 99 strikeouts in a career-high 146 innings. After the 2016 season, the Blue Jays assigned Greene to the Mesa Solar Sox of the Arizona Fall League. He made four starts for Mesa and struggled with his control, walking 11 batters in 10 total innings. Greene spent all of 2017 with New Hampshire. In 132 innings (26 games with 25 being starts), Greene went 5–10 with a 5.29 ERA and 92 strikeouts. He continued to struggle with his command, issuing 83 walks. On November 20, 2017, Greene was added to Toronto's 40-man roster.

St. Louis Cardinals
On January 19, 2018, the Blue Jays traded Greene (along with Dominic Leone) to the St. Louis Cardinals in exchange for Randal Grichuk. He began the 2018 season with the Double-A Springfield Cardinals and was promoted to the Triple-A Memphis Redbirds in June. In forty games (ten starts) between the two clubs, he pitched to a 4–5 record with a 4.09 ERA and a 1.58 WHIP. After the season, the Cardinals assigned him to the Surprise Saguaros of the Arizona Fall League. On November 20, 2018, Greene was designated for assignment by the Cardinals.

Kansas City Royals
On November 26, 2018, Greene was claimed off waivers by the Kansas City Royals. Greene split the 2019 season between the Double-A Northwest Arkansas Naturals and the Triple-A Omaha Storm Chasers, recording a cumulative 4–9 record and 5.13 ERA in 29 appearances. Greene was designated for assignment by Kansas City on November 20, 2019. Greene did not play in a game in 2020 due to the cancellation of the minor league season because of the COVID-19 pandemic. He became a free agent on November 2, 2020.

Baltimore Orioles
On December 3, 2020, Greene signed a minor league contract with the Baltimore Orioles organization. Greene was assigned to the Triple-A Norfolk Tides to begin the 2021 season. Greene posted a 1–3 record and 7.39 ERA in 9 appearances with Norfolk. On July 24, 2021, Greene was selected to the 40-man roster and promoted to the major leagues for the first time. Greene made his MLB debut on July 27, pitching in relief against the Miami Marlins. He pitched two innings, giving up one run and striking out two. On August 7, 2021, Greene was designated for assignment by the Orioles.

Los Angeles Dodgers
Greene was claimed off waivers by the Los Angeles Dodgers on August 9, 2021. He pitched in two games for the Dodgers, allowing two hits but no runs in two innings before he was designated for assignment on August 20.

Baltimore Orioles (second stint)
On August 23, 2021, Greene was claimed off of waivers by the Orioles.
Greene pitched in 24 games in 2021, posting a 7.11 ERA with 26 strikeouts. On November 3, 2021, the Orioles outrighted Greene to Triple-A Norfolk. However, he rejected this, making him a free agent.

On March 14, 2022, Greene re-signed with the Orioles organization on a minor league contract that included an invitation to Spring Training. He was released on June 2, 2022.

Diablos Rojos del México
On July 2, 2022, Greene signed with the Diablos Rojos del México of the Mexican League.

Personal life
Greene is an avid surfer, and has also worked as a model. He is friends with actor Charlie Sheen, and made several minor appearances on the television series Anger Management.

References

External links

1995 births
Living people
Baltimore Orioles players
Baseball players from Santa Monica, California
Bluefield Blue Jays players
Diablos Rojos del México players
Dunedin Blue Jays players
Gulf Coast Blue Jays players
Lansing Lugnuts players
Los Angeles Dodgers players
Major League Baseball pitchers
Memphis Redbirds players
Mesa Solar Sox players
New Hampshire Fisher Cats players
Norfolk Tides players
Northwest Arkansas Naturals players
Omaha Storm Chasers players
Springfield Cardinals players
Surprise Saguaros players
American expatriate baseball players in Mexico
Cañeros de Los Mochis players